Pulickel Madhavapanicker Ajayan, known as P. M. Ajayan, is the Benjamin M. and Mary Greenwood Anderson Professor in Engineering at Rice University. He is the founding chair of Rice University's Materials Science and NanoEngineering department and also holds joint appointments with the Department of Chemistry and Department of Chemical and Biomolecular Engineering. Prior to joining Rice, he was the Henry Burlage Professor of Material Sciences and Engineering and the director of the NYSTAR interconnect focus center at Rensselaer Polytechnic Institute until 2007. Known for his pioneering work of designing and carrying out the first experiments to make nanotubes intentionally.

Early life and education
Ajayan was born on 15 July 1962 at Kodungallur, a coastal town in Thrissur District, in the Indian state of Kerala, to Pulickal Madhava Panickar, a telephone mechanic, and Radha, a teacher at the local school. He studied in a government school in Kodungallur where the medium of instruction was Malayalam until 6th standard, after which he moved to Loyola School, Thiruvananthapuram, a high school he has credited for making a strong impact on him, and for making him "realize that learning is the most exciting thing one can ever befriend". He graduated from Loyola in 1977. In 1985, Ajayan graduated at the top of his class with a BTech degree in Metallurgical Engineering from Indian Institute of Technology (BHU) Varanasi. In 1989, he earned a PhD in Materials Science and Engineering from Northwestern University, Evanston, Illinois. Afterwards he spent three years as a post-doc at NEC corporation, Japan, two years as a researcher at the Laboratoire de Physique des Solides, Orsay, France, and one year at the Max Planck Institute for Metals Research, Stuttgart, Germany.

Research
Ajayan is a pioneer in the field of nanotechnology. His PhD work (1989) involved the characterisation of gold nanoparticles on oxide substrates and their phase instabilities. He was involved in the early development of  carbon nanotubes. From 1991 onwards, at the NEC Fundamental Research Laboratory in Tsukuba, Japan, he worked with Sumio Iijima and Thomas Ebbesen and published some of the early works in carbon nanotubes. During the past two decades he has published more than 400 papers on various aspects of carbon nanostructures, mostly on nanotubes and recently on graphene  and other layered materials such as boron nitride. Ajayan's research interests are broad, focusing on nanomaterials development for a variety of applications such as energy storage, composites, electronics and sensors. His publications have earned more than 68,000 citations on Google Scholar and a h-index of 120 until September 2015. He has to his credit, two Guinness World Records for creating the smallest brush and the darkest material. Ajayan's team created the darkest known material, a carpet of carbon nanotubes, that reflects only 0.045% of light. In August 2007, he was in the news for creating an energy storage device on a piece of paper, called the paper battery. In a brief interview with Discover Magazine, Ajayan stated he believes the paper battery will have many important future applications in industry and medicine. In 2012, Ajayan's group announced a paint-on battery design, which eventually can eliminate restrictions on the surfaces used for energy storage  More recently, Ajayan's group developed a green battery consisting of environmentally friendly lithium-ion cathode, which can lead to the development of completely bio-friendly batteries Ajayan's research group is also focusing on the development of various materials for environmental applications and, last year the group developed a hybrid material capable of effectively removing contaminants from water by coating the sand with carbon. In 2012, Ajayan's group developed a macro-scale carbon nanotube sponge, in which nanotubes are covalently connected each other, and demonstrated its selective absorption of oil from oil-water mixture.

Ajayan's present research interests include nanotechnology enabled energy storage devices (battery, supercapacitor and hybrid devices), nanocomposites, layered materials, 3D nanostructured materials, and smart material systems. Apart from leading a research group (~40 people, including post-docs, graduate and undergraduate students, and international visiting scholars), he focuses on teaching and lecturing around the world on nanotechnology. He regularly serves on the advisory board of several materials and nanotechnology journals, nanotechnology startups and international conferences. In his role as an academic at Rice and RPI, Ajayan has been a major promoter of nanotechnology, teaching various interdisciplinary courses at the undergraduate and graduate level, emphasising the changes occurring in the science and engineering curriculum. Constantly travelling to expand the field, Ajayan's group has a large number of collaborators worldwide and he spends a good amount of time abroad and inside the United States. He has visiting Professor positions at various prestigious Universities around the world, such as Tsinghua University (Beijing, China), Indian Institute of Science (Bangalore, India) and Shinshu University (Japan). He was a visiting professor at ISIS, Strasbourg, France for several months during 2003 and a Helmoltz-Humboldt prize winner and frequent visitor at the Institute of Nanotechnology in Karlsruhe Institute of Technology, Karlsruhe, Germany during 2007–2010. He was listed among the world's most cited materials scientists by Elsevier Scopus in 2016.

Personal life
Ajayan is married to Poornima and has two daughters, Anakha and Ahi.

Honors
 Swadeshi Shastra Puraskaram, Swadeshi Science Movement, Kerala (2012)
 Distinguished Alumnus Award - IIT BHU (2012)
 DST-IISC Centennial Chair Professorship, Bangalore India (2011)
 Elected Honorary Member of Materials Research Society of India (2008)
 Helmoltz-Humboldt Senior Award (2008)
 Scientific American 50 – Research Leader in 2006
 Materials Research Society (MRS) medal, 2006
 Holder of two Guinness Book of World Records (2007, 2005)
 Helmoltz-Humboldt Prize (2007)
 Selected Nano50TM Innovator by Nanotech Briefs (2007)
 Elected Fellow of AAAS (2007)
 Distinguished Alumnus Award, Department of Metallurgy, IIT BHU (2005)
 Kerala Center Award (2005)
 RPI Senior Research Award (2003)
 National Science Foundation CAREER early development award (1998)
 Microscopic Society of America Burton award (1997)
 Electron Microscopy Society of America Presidential Student Award (1989)
 Hadfield Medal for Outstanding Metallurgist (1985)
 Gold Medal - IIT BHU (1985)

References

External links

Rice University – Faculty Page of Pulickel M. Ajayan
Prof. Ajayan speaks on NPR about the extremely small brushes he and his team made
Prof. Ajayan speaks at Oceanit about nanotechnology

Loyola School, Thiruvananthapuram alumni
Living people
Indian nanotechnologists
Banaras Hindu University alumni
Scientists from Kerala
Rensselaer Polytechnic Institute faculty
Rice University faculty
People from Thrissur district
1962 births
American people of Indian descent
Indian materials scientists
20th-century Indian engineers
Carbon scientists
Indian Institute of Technology (BHU) Varanasi alumni